The Snowshoe Formation is a geologic formation in Oregon. It preserves fossils dating back to the Toarcian to Bathonian stages of the Early to Middle Jurassic period.

Fossil content 
Among others, the following fossils have been reported from the formation:
 Loricata
 Zoneait nargorum

See also 
 List of fossiliferous stratigraphic units in Oregon
 Paleontology in Oregon
 Hyde Formation
 Posidonia Shale

References

Bibliography 
 
 K. Yeh. 2009. A Middle Jurassic radiolarian fauna from South Fork Member of Snowshoe Formation, east-central Oregon. Collection and Research 22:15-125

Geologic formations of Oregon
Jurassic geology of Oregon
Toarcian Stage
Limestone formations of the United States
Mudstone formations
Sandstone formations of the United States
Deep marine deposits
Open marine deposits
Paleontology in Oregon